Shin Jae-Pil (born 25 May 1982) is a South Korean footballer who plays as a midfielder for Malaysian club MISC-MIFA.

Career
He joined Anyang LG Cheetahs in the 2001 K League draft. He moved to Ansan Hallelujah after finishing his military duty in Police FC.

He was appointed a captain of the team before 2013 season starts.

Melaka United
He joined promoted Melaka United in Malaysia Premier League from 1 January to 20 June 2016. Wearing shirt number 14.

References

External links 

1982 births
Living people
Association football defenders
South Korean footballers
Korean Police FC (Semi-professional) players
Suwon FC players
Goyang Zaicro FC players
K League 1 players
FC Seoul players
Korea National League players
K League 2 players
Melaka United F.C. players
MISC-MIFA players